Roberto Giacobbo (born 12 October 1961) is an Italian journalist, author, television presenter and television writer.

He has a bachelor's degree in Economics and Commerce.

He has been the presenter of cultural programs on Italian television, wrote and published numerous books and articles about archaeology and scientific discoveries.

He was the author and presenter of the television program , popular program of the Italian channel Rai Due.

Currently Head of Authoritative Group and Contents Television Network of the Italian channel Focus and presenter of Mediaset network Rete 4 with his .

He considers himself Roman Catholic.

Books

References

Italian journalists
Italian male journalists
Italian Roman Catholics
1961 births
Living people